Emma George (born 1 November 1974 in Beechworth, Victoria) is a former Australian pole vaulter. She set twelve world records in a row in the late nineties, but she lost the record on 26 May 2000 to Stacy Dragila and was unable to recapture it. She was previously a trapeze artist in The Flying Fruit Fly Circus. She was coached by world-renowned coach Mark Stewart, who also led Steve Hooker to Olympic gold.

George competed in and won the Gladiator Individual Sports Athletes Challenge in 1995.

George suffered a fall while training for the 1999 Seville Championships. She then underwent a number of operations on her back before finally announcing her retirement in 2003.

World records
4.25 m - Melbourne, Australia 30 November 1995
4.28 m - Perth, Australia 17 December 1995
4.30 m - Perth, Australia 28 January 1996
4.41 m - Perth, Australia 28 January 1996
4.42 m - Reims, France 29 June 1996
4.45 m - Sapporo, Japan 14 July 1996
4.50 m - Melbourne, Australia 8 February 1997
4.55 m - Melbourne, Australia 20 February 1997
4.57 m - Auckland, New Zealand 20 February 1998
4.58 m - South Melbourne, Australia 14 March 1998
4.59 m - Brisbane, Australia 21 March 1998
4.60 m - Sydney, Australia 20 February 1999

Achievements

References

External links 
 Profile at Athletics Australia
 Brief biography at her personal website

1974 births
Living people
Australian female pole vaulters
Athletes (track and field) at the 1998 Commonwealth Games
Athletes (track and field) at the 2000 Summer Olympics
Olympic athletes of Australia
People from Beechworth
World record setters in athletics (track and field)
Commonwealth Games gold medallists for Australia
Commonwealth Games medallists in athletics
Universiade medalists in athletics (track and field)
Goodwill Games medalists in athletics
Universiade gold medalists for Australia
Trapeze artists
Medalists at the 1997 Summer Universiade
Competitors at the 1998 Goodwill Games
Medallists at the 1998 Commonwealth Games